The Gates of Delhi were city gates at various medieval townships around Delhi, built under dynastic rulers in the period that could be dated from the 8th century to the 20th century. They are the gates in:
 The ancient city of Qila Rai Pithora or Lal Kot, also called the first city of Delhi (period 731–1311) in Mehrauli – Qutb Complex 
 The second city of Siri Fort (1304) 
 The third city Tughlaqabad (1321–23);
 The fourth city of Jahanpanah (mid-14th century)
 The fifth city of Firozabad (1354) 
 The sixth city of Dinpanah/Shergarh (1534), near Purana Qila
 The seventh city Shahjahanabad (mid 17th century)
 The eighth modern city New Delhi of British Raj (1920s) in Lutyens' Delhi of the British rule

In 1611, the European merchant William Finch described Delhi as the city of seven castles (forts) and 52 gates. More gates were built after that period during the Mughal rule and during the British rule. Only 13 gates exist in good condition, while all others are in ruins or have been demolished. Like all gates denote, the direction of the destination station is the starting name of the gate.

Gates in the 1st city

In the first city of Delhi, 13 gates were built in the 11th-century citadel of Lal Kot, with the extended Qila Rai Pithora, which was ruled by the Slave Dynasty from 1192 with the establishment of the Qutb complex. These were in the rubble-built ramparts of Lal Kot ( thickness) of which only a few remain, either in ruins or under renovation. These are the Chaumukha, Sohan, Ranjit, Fateh, Hauz Rani, Barka, Badaun, and Budayuni gates. Of these, the Chaumukha, Ranjit, Sohan, and Fateh Darwaza have been listed by the INTACH as heritage monuments. The ruins of Hauz Rani and Barka are seen around the remains between giant gaps in the long stretches of the Lal Kot wall, surrounded by a wide moat on the outside. Archaeological Survey of India (ASI) has proposed to conserve all the identified gates.

The Chaumukha Darwaza (Chaumukha in Hindi language means four faces) is inferred as the gateway of Lal Kot since it aligns with Lal Kot walls. It is near the Qutb Complex and has been categorized as Grade B in archaeological value. It has been conserved by the ASI. The gate's architectural style is traced to the Tuglaq period in view of its massive thickness. It has a "horned" outwork with paved stones in an engraved grid pattern that indicates that it was designed for defense purposes. The purpose for which it was built has not been discerned. Hence, it has also been conjectured that it could have been built by Thomas Metcalfe as one of his follies, close to his original 'Dilkusha' mansion (now seen in ruins) to enhance the elegance of his retreat.

The Ranjit gate towards the north wall of Lal Kot is in ruins. It was once considered as a grand gate through which the Turks had entered the city. Hence, it was subsequently fortified to prevent any further foreign incursions. Only part of the gate is visible and is yet to be listed as a heritage monument.

The Sohan Gate guarded by a large bastion called the Sohan Burj was stated to be the location of a Sun temple.

Hauz Rani and Budayuni Gates, which were reportedly once-prominent gates, are now traced in ruins. An anecdote of history of the Budayuni gate, considered then as the principal gate of the city by Ibn Battuta (the chronicler of the period, mentions it as the main gate to the city), is that Allauddin Khalji had resolved to shun drinking of alcohol by emptying his wine caskets and breaking his rich Chinaware at this gate. The gate was also known for the punishment meted out to the guilty. They were tortured and beheaded in public view at this gate. A strict watch was maintained at this gate to detect and prevent incursions by Mongols.

Alauddin Khalji had planned, as part of his ambitious architectural achievements, to build four Darwaza (gates), but he could build only one during his lifetime, the Alai Darwaza (1311). This gate is seen at the southern end of the Qutb complex of the enlarged Quwwat-ul-Islam mosque, built entirely on the principles of Islamic architecture. The gate made of rectangular bands of red sandstone and white marble has inscriptions of verses from Koran and Hadis in elaborate carvings on its windows. It is a square building ( square) with dome with horse shoe pointed shaped arches on three sides and with a semicircular arch on the northern side. The underside of the arches have fringed lotus bud embellishments. Historian Fanshawe writing euphorically on the beauty of the gate extolled: "The Alai Darwaza is not only the most beautiful structure at the Kutub, but is one of the most striking specimens of external polychromatic decoration not merely in India, but in the whole world, while the carving of interior may challenge comparison with any work of the kind. Both exterior and interior merit detailed and leisurely examination. The effect of the graceful pointed arches in the three external sides of the gate, and in the corner recesses is extremely pleasing, and the view from the exterior through the southern archway to the round-headed arch of the north side, and the court beyond, is very striking. The decoration of the north arch is curious and unique. The effect of exterior suffers, from a distant point of view, from the absence of a parapet above the walls; this was unfortunately removed by Captain Smith, as it was greatly ruined. The gate was finished five years before the emperor died, and is specially mentioned by the chronicler of his reign."' Shahjahanabad was built by Shah Jahan in the year 1639. It Has 14 gates, west of Red Fort. Delhi has been the capital of India for more than 1000 years. New Delhi became the capital of India in 1912.

Gates in the 2nd city

The second medieval city of Siri Fort was built during the rule of Ala-ud-Din Khalji of the Delhi Sultanate with the major objective of protecting the city from the onslaught of the Mongols. The city, when built with an oval plan, was best described as presenting an embodiment of richness with palaces and other structures and had seven gates for entry and exit. But, at present, only the Southeastern gate exists, also in ruins (pictured). The destruction of the fort and its gates are attributed more to the local rulers of subsequent dynasties who removed the stones, bricks and other artifacts of the fort for their own buildings and palaces.

Gates in the 3rd city

Tughlaqabad, the third city of medieval Delhi, built by Ghazi Malik is well known as Ghiyath al-Din Tughluq who established the Tughlaq Dynasty in 1321 after ousting the Khaljis, was enclosed within a fort of massive proportions completed in a short span of four years. The fort has inclined walls with triple storied citadels, enormous towers, mosques, and halls. The city when built is stated to have had 52 gates but only 13 remain today, mostly in ruins. Of the remaining gates, the main entry gate to the fort was built in typical Pathan style, which is described as made of red sandstone with sloping face and jambs which merge well with the towers of the fort. But the fort was abandoned soon after Ghiyasuddin's death for two reasons namely, water shortage and the foolhardy decision of his successor Sultan, the Muhammad bin Tughlaq who forcibly shifted his capital to the new city of Daulatabad in the Deccan and returned to found the fourth city of Jahanpanah.

Gates in the 4th city
Muhammad bin Tughluq, first built Adilabad, then Nai-ka-Kot, towards the south of Tughlaqabad. These were two small fortresses. But he soon abandoned them. He built a new city by enclosing the areas lying between the cities of Siri, Tughlaqabad and Lal Kot. The city was named as Jahanpanah, an asylum of the world, in 1334. The city had 13 gates. The ruins of gigantic ramparts of his two fortresses and some portions of the Jahanpanah walls have survived the ravages of time but are seen now only in total ruins. The watchtower Bijai Mandal still stands in ruins in the city of Jahanpanah. But no fort gates are traced.

Gates in the 5th city
Firuz Shah Tughlaq built a new capital city on the banks of the Yamuna River in 1351 and called it Firozabad. The architecture of the fort was fairly simple and straightforward. The city had three palaces and a citadel known as Feroz Shah Kotla. The king's, as well as his wife's quarters, were situated along the riverfront. The structures within the enclosure walls of the fort were barracks, armories, servant's rooms, halls for audience, an imposing mosque as well as public and private baths and a stepped well or baoli. An Ashokan pillar brought from Topara, Ambala was mounted on top of a pyramidal three-tiered construction. No gates of this period exist.

Gates in the 6th city

Three main gates on the north, south and west are part of the fortifications of the Purana Qila, the sixth city of Delhi, built by Sher Shah Suri (1538–45). Sher Shah Suri raised his citadel after demolishing Dinpanah, the city built by Humayun. Bastions adorned the corners and the western wall. Of the existing three gates, the west gate forms the entrance to the Qila and is called the Bara Darwaza (big gate). All three gates are double–storied structures built with red sandstone and have chhatris. The enclosure wall inside has cells in two–bay depth. The northern gate, built in 1543–44, is called the Talaqi-Darwaza for reasons unknown. On this gate, in the front, carved marble leogryphs in combat with a man are seen above the oriel windows. Built in random rubble masonry with dressed stone facing, the gate has a tall arch enclosed by two smaller arched openings. Two bastions adorn the gate with high ceiling rooms. On the second floor of the gate, there are two openings. Exterior surface of the gate had coloured tiles and the inner rooms were covered with incised plaster work. The Purana Qila was stated to have been left unfinished by Suri, which was later completed by Humayun. The southern gate is called the Humayun Darwaza; the reasons attributed for the name are that either Humayun built it or the gate overlooked Humayun's tomb. An inscription in ink on the gate refers to Sher Shah with the date as 950 A.H. (1543–44).

Sher Shah Gate

Sher Shah gate located to the south of Khairu’l-Manazil-Masjid is said to be an entrance to the large city of Delhi that Sher Shah built in front of his fortress of Purana Qila. The gate, mostly built with red sandstone but with use of local grey quartzite in its upper storey, is thus called the Lal Darwaza (red gate). Arcades were built from this gate into the city, which were provided with series of dwellings with frontage of a verandah, which may have been used for commercial establishments. Kabuli or Khuni–Darwaza (explained in the following section) is another gate on the fringes of Sher Shah's city. ASI has undertaken extensive conservation works of the gate and its surroundings at a cost of Rs 7.5 million (US$150,000).

Gates in the 7th city

Shahjahanabad, the seventh city of Delhi, was built by Shah Jahan in 1649 like a fortress encircled by strong and high red–brick walls with 14 entry gates to the city, in addition to 16 wicket gates called windows (khirkis in Urdu language). A number of bastions built of stone were added by the British, in addition to repairing the earlier fort, to make the fort more secure. The gates were designed and built for the people to have access and the royal procession to enter or exit when going out in diverse directions. Out of the 14 gates, five gates have survived, namely, the Kashmiri Gate on the north, the Ajmeri Gate on the south-west, the Delhi Gate on the south-east, Turkman Gate on the south and the Nigambodh Gate on the north-east, all of which express vividly the splendor of the city. The Lahori gate on the Northeast, in the old city, was demolished (some remnant walls are seen at the crossing as may be seen in picture) and the area converted into the present day Lahori Bazar. The gates have a square plan with high arched openings, except for low height of the Nigambodh gate, and two openings—one for entry and another for exit—of the Kashmiri gate. The names of all the gates, which existed during Shahajahan's time are the Dilli Darwaza (also known as Delhi Gate), Kabuli Darwaza, Raj Ghat Darwaza, Khizri Darwaza, Nigambodh Darwaza, Kela Ke Ghat ka Darwaza, Lal Darwaza, Kashmiri Darwaza, Badar Darwaza, Patthar Khati Darwaza, Lahori Darwaza, Ajmeri Darwaza and Turkuman Darwaza.

The names of the wicket gates or windows (now none exist) through which people entered and exited from the old fort city were:
 Zeenatul Masajid Khirkee
 Nawab Ahmad Bakhsh ki Khirkee
 Nawab Ghaziuddin ki Khirkee
 Musamman Burj ki Khirkee
 Muslim Garh ki Khirkee
 Naseer Ganj ki Khirkee
 Nai Khirkee
 Shah Ganj Khirkee
 Ajmeri Darwaza ki Khirkee
 Sayyad Bhole ki Khirkee
 Buland Bagh ki Khirkee
 Farash Khana ki Khirkee
 Ameer Khan ki Khirkee
 Khalil Khan ki Khirkee
 Bahadur Ali Khan ki Khirkee
 Nigambodh ki Khirkee.

Kashmiri gate

Kashmiri Gate is one of the original 14 gates built into the wall to the north of the city. It was built by British Major Robert Smith in 1835. Local people also call it Truckman gate. It has a square plan. There are two openings of the gate: one for entry and another for exit (pictured). During 1835, the British enlarged and straightened it into a two-way gate as defensive measure against enemy attacks. In the present city setting, the gate is close to the Inter State Bus Terminals. It is now preserved as monument on the road to the Old Secretariat and the Delhi University. It was named as Kashmiri Gate since it was used by the emperors to go through on their visits to Kashmir and North India. It was also the historic venue of the intense fighting which took place in 1857, between British forces and Indian rebels. The fortifications were used to fire cannons at the British forces encamped at Ludlow Castle. The rebels gathered at a place close to the St. James Church to discuss war strategy. British forces fought fiercely at this gate and re-captured the city from the rebels. During the war, the gate was badly damaged by British cannon fire to get control over Delhi. Subsequently, area surrounding the Kashmiri Gate became the commercial hub of Delhi, when the Civil Lines were developed by the British.

Delhi Gate

The Delhi Gate (Coordinates 28.641196N 77.240511E) is the southern gate in the historic walled city of (Old) Delhi, or Shahjahanabad. The gate links the New Delhi city with the old walled city of Delhi. It stands in the middle of the road, at the end of Netaji Subhash Chandra Road (or Netaji Subhash Marg), at the edge of the Daryaganj.
Other Delhi Gate of Delhi, is also situated in Najafgarh.

Ajmeri Gate

Ajmeri Gate, built in 1644, to the south–west of Shahjahanabad with a square plan, has high arched openings. It was one of the battlefields of the Sepoy Mutiny or the first war of Indian independence in 1857. The road, through this gate, leads to the city of Ajmer in Rajasthan, and hence its name. A lovely park surrounds the gate. The madrasa (Islamic school of learning) built by Nawab Ghaziuddin Bahadur father of the first Nizam of Hyderabad in 1811, west of the college lies the tomb of the founder and a mosque In the following years, it converted to Delhi college and was one of the constituent colleges of the Delhi University. The college has shifted to a new building now and the Anglo Arabic Senior Secondary School runs in the old building. Nearby outside a ditch, once lied remains of the underground apartments of Safdarjung, which at one point were one of the important sights of Delhi. At present, the old walls of the fort have been demolished and replaced by commercial buildings and residential complexes, but the gate on the west exists.

Turkman Gate

Turkman Gate, located to the southern edge of Shahajahanabad (Coordinates: 28.642231N 77.232591E), is named after the Sufi Saint Shah Turkman Bayabani. His tomb dated to 1240, before building of Shahjahanabad, is located to the east of the gate. It is approached from the Jawahar Lal Nehru Road, the old Circular Road, in the vicinity of the Ramlila grounds. It has a square plan with high arched openings. The tomb of Razia Sultan and Kali Masjid or Kalan Masjid are located in close proximity of the gate./. The gate was the scene of Turkman gate demolition and rioting in 1976.

Lahori Gate, Old Delhi

The Lahori gate of the Old Delhi city (Coordinates: 28.657110N 77.218831E), now only a bazaar square with small remnants at one end, used to lead east along the Chandni Chowk to the Lahore gate of the Red Fort. Inside the Lahori gate is the grain market. Outside the gate stands a mosque built by Sirhindi Begum, wife of Shah Jahan, whom he married after the death Arjumand Banu Begum, Mumtaz Mahal. This Lahori Gate was also one of the last points captured during the siege of 1857.

Lahore Gate, Red Fort

The Lahore gate (Coordinates: 28.655879N 77.238666E) is the main gate to the Red Fort named after its orientation towards Lahore, Pakistan.

Delhi Gate, Red Fort

The southern public entrance to the Red Fort (Coordinates: 28.652148N 77.240112E).

Nigambodh Gate

It was built on the north eastern side of the Shahjahanabad. It is located on the Ring Road near the Yamuna Bazaar. It derives its name Nigambodh Ghat from the burial ground here. The etymology of Nigambodh is derived from Sanskrit words 'Nigam' which means the "Ved" and 'bodh' means "knowledge", meaning realization of knowledge. According to a folk legend, Lord Brahma (the creator) took a bath in the Yamuna River at this ghat to recover his lost memory and by this act Brahma not only got back his memory but also remembered the place he had kept his sacred books. In the past, the gate was closer to the ghat and nearer to the Salimgarh Fort.

Kabuli Gate

Kabuli Gate or Khooni Darwaza (Coordinates: 28.635974N 77.241042E), literally translated means "Bloody Gate", a "morbid sounding name".
It is an impressive double–storied structure. Its construction is credited to Sher Shah Suri's reign from 1540 to 1545 (though the fort walls of the Suri period have not been seen to extend to this gate). It was built largely with grey stone but red stones were also used in the frames of its windows.
Though not within the walls of the Shahajahan's fort, it is located on the Mathura road opposite to the Ferozshah Kotla near Maulana Azad Medical College.
At this gate, on 21 September 1857, during the Indian Rebellion, three sons of the last Mughal Emperor, Bahadur Shah Zafar, were executed by the British Officer, Captain William Hodson.

Bahadur Shahi Gate

Salimgarh Fort, which is now part of the Red fort complex, was constructed on an island of the Yamuna River in 1546. But a gate called the Bahadur Shahi Gate for entry into the Fort from the northern side was constructed only in 1854–55 by Bahadur Shah Zafar, the last Mughal ruler of India. The gate was built in brick masonry with moderate use of red sandstone. The fort was used during the Uprising in 1857 and also as a prison, which housed Zebunnisa, daughter of Aurangzeb; the British imprisoned the freedom fighters of Indian National Army. The layout of the Red Fort was organized to retain and integrate this site with the Salimgarh Fort through the Bahadur Shah Gate.

Gates in the 8th city

Delhi became the capital of British India after the seat of power was shifted from Calcutta in 1911. With this shift, the new city of New Delhi was established and the seventh city of Shahajahanabad to its north became the Old Delhi. Based on the designs of Edwin Lutyens, New Delhi was built over 20 years. One of the important landmarks built during this period was the India Gate. Built in 1921, it is officially known as All India War Memorial (an arch) to the Indian soldiers killed in the World War I, the Northwest Frontier operations of the same time and the 1919 Afghan fiasco. The gate has an impressive stone arch of  height; the names of over 90,000 soldiers are engraved on it. The base of the gate is built in red Bharatpur stone and displays a shallow domed bowl. The past tradition was to fill this bowl with oil and light it as a lamp on anniversaries but is no more practiced, instead, an eternal flame burns below the arch. The eternal flame was added in the 1970s in the arch of the Gate to honour the Immortal Soldier. It is flanked by two uniformed soldiers. The place takes a carnival atmosphere in the evenings when it is well lighted and visitors flock to the gate. Seen behind the India Gate is an impressive Chhatri, which displayed the statue of King George V till 1968. This statue has been shifted to the Coronation Park, Delhi, which was the site of the declaration of the new capital of Delhi. The Chhatri is now devoid of any statue since there is a protracted discussion on which National leader's statue should be installed there. There is an impressive set of a large central steel gates flanked by asymmetrically designed smaller gates that provides entry into the Rashtrapati Bhavan (President's palace). A commemorative column called the Jaipur Column with a "distinctly peculiar crown: a glass star springing out of bronze lotus blossom", is located midway between the entry gates and the Rashtrapati Bhavan.

Gallery

The grave to the east of Turkman Gate is not the mausoleum of the 13th century Sufi Shams-ul-Arifeen Shah Turkman Byabani. The Shrine of the Sufi is deep inside Mohalla Qabristan and can be approached either through Mohammad Deen Ilaichi Marg or through the road leading to Chitli Qabar from Turkman Gate. The grave to the east of Turkman Gate has nothing to do with the Sufi and this is some imposter who is using a lack of information on the Sufi Sanit to make some quick buck.

See also

 Gates in India
 History of Delhi
 Gates in Aurangabad

References

External links
 

 
History of Delhi
Monuments and memorials in Delhi
Archaeological monuments in Delhi
Delhi